The Oakville Centre for the Performing Arts is a municipally run multi-use facility which opened in downtown Oakville, Ontario, Canada in 1977.  The Oakville Centre was built to provide Oakville residents with a place to learn about themselves and the world around them through dance, music, storytelling and theatre.

The Oakville Centre contains two theatres, a 470-seat auditorium and a 120-seat intimate studio theatre.  The Oakville Centre presents up to 260 performances a year which includes local, Canadian and international artists from around the world.

The Oakville Centre is home to several local-oriented performing arts groups:
Oakville Ballet Company
Oakville Drama Series
Oakville Symphony Orchestra
Oakville Wind Orchestra

Past professional performances have included:
Blind Boys of Alabama
Bill Cosby
Arlo Guthrie
Rita MacNeil
Anne Murray
Bob Newhart
Don Rickles
Lily Tomlin
Tower of Power
Roch Voisine

External links
Official Site

Buildings and structures in Oakville, Ontario
Theatres in Ontario
Culture of the Regional Municipality of Halton
Tourist attractions in the Regional Municipality of Halton